The Hours is a 1998 novel written by Michael Cunningham. It won the 1999 Pulitzer Prize for Fiction, the 1999 PEN/Faulkner Award for Fiction, and was later made into an Oscar-winning 2002 film of the same name starring Nicole Kidman, Meryl Streep and Julianne Moore.

Plot introduction

The book concerns three generations of women affected by the classic novel Mrs Dalloway.

In 1923 Richmond, outside London, author Virginia Woolf is writing Mrs Dalloway and struggling with her  mental illness. In 1949 Los Angeles, Laura Brown is reading Mrs Dalloway while planning a birthday party for her husband, a World War II veteran. In 1999 New York City, Clarissa Vaughan plans a party to celebrate a major literary award received by her good friend and former lover, the poet Richard, who is dying of an AIDS-related illness.

The situations of all three characters mirror situations experienced by Woolf's Clarissa Dalloway in Mrs Dalloway, with Clarissa Vaughan being a very literal modern-day version of Woolf's character. Like Mrs Dalloway, Clarissa Vaughan goes on a journey to buy flowers while reflecting on the minutiae of the day around her and later prepares to throw a party. Clarissa Dalloway and Clarissa Vaughan also both contrast their histories and past loves with their current lives, which they both perceive as trivial. Several other characters in Clarissa Vaughan's story also parallel characters in Woolf's Mrs Dalloway.

Cunningham's novel also mirrors Mrs Dalloway's stream-of-consciousness narrative style (a style pioneered by Woolf and James Joyce) in which the flowing thoughts and perceptions of protagonists are depicted as they would occur in real life, unfiltered, flitting from one thing to another, and often rather unpredictable. In terms of time, this means characters interact not only with the present, but also memories; this contextualizes personal history and backstory, which otherwise might appear quite trivial—buying flowers, baking a cake, and such things.

Cunningham's novel also uses the device in Woolf's Mrs Dalloway of placing the action of the novel within the space of one day. In Woolf's Mrs Dalloway is one day in the life of the central character Clarissa Dalloway. In Cunningham's book it is one day in the life of each of the three central characters; Clarissa Vaughan, Laura Brown, and Virginia Woolf herself. Through this prism, Cunningham attempts, as did Woolf, to show the beauty and profundity of every day—even the most ordinary—in every person's life and conversely how a person's whole life can be examined through the prism of one single day.

Cunningham took the novel's title, The Hours, from the original working title that Virginia Woolf used for Mrs Dalloway.

Plot summary

This summary does not contain the whole book. The stream-of-consciousness style being so prominent in this work, a summary of the plot based on physical action does not give a thorough understanding of the content of the work. In the novel, action occurring in the physical world (i.e. characters doing things, such as talking, walking, etc.) is far outweighed by material existing in the thought and memory of the protagonists.

Prologue
In 1941, Virginia Woolf commits suicide by drowning herself in the Ouse, a river in Sussex, England. Even as she is drowning, Virginia marvels at everyday sights and sounds. Leonard Woolf, her husband, finds her suicide note, and Virginia's dead body floats downstream where life, in the form of a mother and child going for a walk, goes on as if Virginia is still taking in all the sights and sounds.
"I don't think two people could have been happier than we have been."
—from Virginia Woolf's suicide note to Leonard Woolf. p. 7, 1999, 4th Estate paperback edition.

Mrs. Dalloway
The novel jumps to New York City at the end of the 20th century where Clarissa Vaughan (Cunningham's modern Mrs Dalloway), announcing she will buy the flowers for a party she's hosting later in the day, paraphrases the opening sentence of Woolf's novel. She leaves her partner Sally cleaning their apartment and heads outside on a June morning. Walking to the flower shop, Clarissa enjoys the everyday hustle and bustle of the city. The sights and sounds she encounters serve as jumping-off points for her thoughts about life, what she loves, and her past. The beautiful day reminds her of a happy memory, a holiday she had as a young woman with two friends, Richard and Louis. The flowers are for a party Clarissa is hosting at her apartment that night for Richard (now a renowned poet dying of AIDS) as he has just won the Carrouthers, an esteemed poetry prize awarded for a life's work. Clarissa bumps into Walter, an acquaintance who writes gay pulp fiction romances. Clarissa invites him to the party although she knows Richard abhors Walter's shallow interests in "fame and fashions, the latest restaurant". Clarissa herself appreciates Walter's "greedy innocence". Clarissa continues on her way reflecting on her past, sometimes difficult relationship with Richard which she compares to her more stable but unspectacular relationship with her partner of eighteen years, Sally. She finally arrives at the flower shop.
"What a thrill, what a shock, to be alive on a morning in June, prosperous, almost scandalously privileged, with a simple errand to run."
—Clarissa reflects on the day as she walks to the flower shop. p. 10, 1999, 4th Estate paperback edition.
"Why doesn't she feel more somber about Richard's perversely simultaneous good fortune ('an anguished, prophetic voice in American letters') and his decline ('You have no T-cells at all, none that we can detect')? What is wrong with her? She loves Richard, she thinks of him constantly, but she perhaps loves the day slightly more."
—Clarissa thinking about Richard. p. 11, 1999, 4th Estate paperback edition.
"The woman's head quickly withdraws, and the door to the trailer closes again, but she leaves behind her an unmistakable sense of watchful remonstrance, as if an angel had briefly touched the surface of the world with one sandaled foot, asked if there was any trouble and, being told all was well, had resumed her place in the ether with skeptical gravity, having reminded the children of earth that they are just barely trusted to manage their own business and that further carelessness will not go unremarked."
—Clarissa spots a movie star sticking her head outside her trailer door in response to a film crew's noisiness. p. 27, 1999, 4th Estate paperback edition.

Mrs. Woolf
The novel then jumps to 1923 with Virginia Woolf waking one morning with the possible first line of a new novel. She carefully navigates her way through the morning, so as not to lose her inspiration. When she picks up her pen, she writes: "Mrs Dalloway said she would buy the flowers herself."

Mrs. Brown
The novel jumps to 1949 Los Angeles with Laura Brown reading the first line of Virginia Woolf's novel Mrs Dalloway ("Mrs Dalloway said she would buy the flowers herself.") Laura Brown is pregnant with her second child and is reading in bed. She does not want to get up despite it being her husband Dan's birthday. She is finding it hard playing the role of wife to Dan, and mother to her son Richie, despite her appreciation for them. She would much rather read her book. She eventually forces herself to go downstairs where she decides to make a cake for Dan's birthday which Richie will help her make. 
"He makes her think sometimes of a mouse singing amorous ballads under the window of a giantess."
—Laura reflecting on her son's transparent love for her. p. 44, 1999, 4th Estate paperback edition.
"...the triumph and the jingle and the strange high singing of some airplane overhead were what she loved; life; London; this moment of June."
—Laura remembering a quote from Woolf's Mrs Dalloway, p. 48, 1999, 4th Estate paperback edition.

Mrs. Dalloway
The novel returns to Clarissa Vaughan who, having left the flower shop with an armload of flowers, decides to stop by Richard's apartment. On her way to Richard's she pauses at the site of a film shoot, hoping to catch a glimpse of a movie star. Eventually, she leaves, having not seen the star, embarrassed at her trivial impulses. Clarissa enters the neighborhood she and Richard frequented as young adults. It is revealed Richard and Clarissa once had a failed experimental romantic relationship together despite it being obvious Richard's "deepest longings" were for Louis with whom he was already in a relationship. Clarissa still wonders what her life might have been if they had tried to stay together. Clarissa enters Richard's apartment building, which she finds squalid. She seems to associate Richard's apartment building with a sense of decay and death. She enters Richard's apartment.

Richard welcomes Clarissa, calling her "Mrs D" a reference to Mrs Dalloway. He calls her this because of the shared first name (Clarissa Vaughan, Clarissa Dalloway) but also because of a sense of shared destiny. As Richard's closest friend, Clarissa has taken on the role of a caregiver through Richard's illness. Richard is struggling with what appears to Clarissa to be mental illness, brought about by his AIDS, and with Clarissa he discusses hearing voices. While Clarissa still enjoys everyday life, it seems Richard's illness has sapped his energy for life and the cleanliness of his apartment is subsequently suffering. As Clarissa fusses about, paying attention to the details of Richard's life that he has neglected, Richard seems resigned. He does not seem to be looking forward to the party Clarissa is organizing for him nearly as much as Clarissa is. Finally, Clarissa leaves promising to return in the afternoon to help him prepare for the party.

Mrs. Woolf
Meanwhile, two hours have passed since Virginia began writing the start of Mrs Dalloway. Reflecting on the uncertainty of the artistic process, she decides she has written enough for the day and is worried that if she continues her fragile mental state will become unbalanced; the onset of which she describes as her "headache". Virginia goes to the printing room (her husband Leonard has set up a printing press, the renowned Hogarth Press which first published Sigmund Freud in English and poet T. S. Eliot) where Leonard and an assistant, Ralph is at work. She senses from Ralph's demeanor the "impossibly demanding" Leonard has just scolded him for some inefficiency. Virginia announces she is going for a walk and will then pitch in with the work.
"She might see it while walking with Leonard in the square, a scintillating silver-white mass floating over the cobblestones, randomly spiked, fluid but the whole, like a jellyfish. 'What's that?' Leonard would ask. 'It's my headache', she'd answer. 'Please ignore it.' "
—Virginia reflecting on the detached nature of her mental illness, p. 70, 1999, 4th Estate paperback edition.
"She decides, with misgivings, that she is finished for today. Always, there are these doubts. Should she try another hour? Is she being judicious, or slothful? Judicious, she tells herself, and almost believes it."
—Virginia, p. 72, 1999, 4th Estate paperback edition.
"The truth, she thinks, sits calmly and plumply, dressed in matronly gray, between these two men."
—Virginia reflecting on whose attitude towards work, the carefree Ralph's, or the "brilliant and indefatigable" Leonard's, has resulted in the two men's conflict, p. 73, 1999, 4th Estate paperback edition.

Mrs. Brown
In parallel imagery to Virginia Woolf's, Laura Brown also goes about an act of creation: making Dan's birthday cake. Richie is helping her, and Laura passes through emotions of intense love for, and annoyance with, Richie. Laura wants desperately to desire nothing more than the life she has as a wife and mother, to be making a cake, and sees both the cake-making and her present lot in life as her art, just as writing is Virginia Woolf's art:
"She will not lose hope. She will not mourn her lost possibilities, her unexplored talents (what if she has no talents, after all?). She will remain devoted to her son, her husband, her home and duties, and all her gifts. She will want this second child."
—Laura's thoughts, the final sentences of the chapter, p. 79, 1999, 4th Estate paperback edition.

Mrs. Woolf
Virginia Woolf is taking her walk while thinking of ideas for her novel. She already believes Clarissa Dalloway will commit suicide, but now Virginia plans for Mrs Dalloway to have had one true love: not her husband, but a girl Clarissa knew during her girlhood. Her love of another girl will have represented a time when she was not afraid to go against the destiny laid out for her by society and family. Virginia plans for Clarissa to kill herself in middle age over something quite trivial, a representation of what her life has become and what has been repressed. As Virginia walks about Richmond she reflects on how Mrs Dalloway's deterioration in middle age represents how Virginia feels about being trapped in suburban Richmond when she only feels fully alive in central London. She is aware she is more susceptible to mental illness in London, but would rather die 'raving mad' in the city than avoid life (and perhaps prolong her years) in Richmond.

As Virginia returns home she feels, as did Laura Brown in the previous chapter, as if she is impersonating herself, as if the person she is presenting herself to requires artifice. She puts on this 'act' to convince herself and others that she is 'sane' so Leonard will agree with the idea of moving back to London. Virginia understands that there is "true art" in the requirement for women such as herself to act as they do. Feeling in control of her 'act' she goes to speak to the cook, Nelly, about lunch. However, Nelly, with her petty grievances and implicit demands that the daily life of running the house which is Virginia's domain, be observed, overwhelms Virginia. Nelly appears to have a matronly competence whilst Virginia does not seem to have a house-wifey bone in her body. Virginia decides to give her character, Clarissa Dalloway, the great skill with servants that she does not possess.

"She is the author; Leonard, Nelly, Ralph, and the others are the readers. This particular novel concerns a serene, intelligent woman of painfully susceptible sensibilities who once was ill but has now recovered; who is preparing for the season in London..."
—Virginia Woolf preparing to 'act' as Virginia Woolf, p. 83, 1999, 4th Estate paperback edition.
"Men may congratulate themselves for writing truly and passionately about the movements of nations; they may consider war and the search for God to be great literature's only subjects; but if men's standing in the world could be toppled by an ill-advised choice of hat, English literature would be dramatically changed."
—pp. 83-84, 1999, 4th Estate paperback edition.
"The trick will be to render intact the magnitude of Clarissa's miniature but very real desperation; to fully convince the reader that, for her, domestic defeats are every bit as devastating as are lost battles to a general."
—Virginia considering how she will write MrsDalloway, p. 84, 1999, 4th Estate paperback edition.
" 'I've got the cress soup', Nelly says. 'And the pie. And then I thought just some of them yellow pears for pudding unless you'd like something fancier.' Here it is, then: the challenge thrown down. Unless you'd like something fancier. So the subjugated Amazon stands on the riverbank wrapped in the fur of animals she has killed and skinned; so she drops a pear before the queen's gold slippers and says, 'Here is what I've brought. Unless you'd like something fancier.' "
—p. 85, 1999, 4th Estate paperback edition.
"...in offering pears, she reminds Virginia that she, Nelly, is powerful; that she knows secrets; that queens who care more about solving puzzles in their chambers than they do about the welfare of their people must take whatever they get."
—p. 85, 1999, 4th Estate paperback edition.

Mrs. Dalloway
Having walked back home from Richard's, Clarissa Vaughan enters her apartment. Her partner Sally, a TV producer, is on her way out the door to a lunch meeting with a film star. Suddenly, left alone, Clarissa feels unmoored. She feels as if her home and its comforts are trivial in light of the impending death of her closest friend Richard; compared to a time when she felt most alive and had everything to hope for. Her apartment is just as much a "realm of the dead" as Richard's. Like the other characters in Cunningham's novel, she questions the value of her present life and whether it isn't a negation via triviality of the life she could lead. Then the feeling moves on. Clarissa is disappointed but relieved to find her life is her own and that she wants no other. She holds onto the prospect of preparing Richard's party as affirmation and begins arrangements.

As Clarissa prepares for the party she thinks of the famous actor Sally is lunching with, a B-movie action star who recently came out as gay. This sparks ruminations on why she, Clarissa, was not invited to lunch and again towards thoughts of the worth of her life. In her mind, she is "only a wife" (p. 94). Clarissa tries to be grateful for the moment she is inhabiting, cutting the stems off roses at the kitchen sink. She thinks of the holiday she had when she was eighteen with Louis and Richard, a time when "it seemed anything could happen, anything at all" (p. 95). She thinks of kissing Richard, a dramatic reversal of the kiss Woolf's Clarissa Dalloway shares with a girl when she was young. Clarissa (Vaughan) realizes without that holiday and the house where she, Richard, and Louis spent it, so many events would not have occurred, including this moment now, standing in a kitchen cutting flowers for her best friend, Richard's, party. She remembers telling herself at the time she was not betraying Louis by sleeping with Richard, it was the free-wheeling 1960s, and Louis was aware of what was going on. She wonders what might have happened if she had tried to remain with Richard. She imagines another future, "full of infidelities and great battles; as a vast and enduring romance laid over friendship so searing and profound, it would accompany them to the grave...She could have had a life as potent and dangerous as literature itself." "Or then again maybe not," Clarissa thinks. She realizes that maybe there is nothing equal to the recollection of having been young. She catalogs the moment she and Richard kissed for the first time, by a pond's edge at dusk. "It had seemed like the beginning of happiness, and Clarissa is still sometimes shocked, more than thirty years, to realize that it 'was' happiness...Now she knows: That was the moment, right then. There has been no other."

"It is revealed to her that all her sorrow and loneliness, the whole creaking scaffold of it, stems simply from pretending to live in this apartment among these objects..."
—Clarissa considers the possibility of escaping her present life, p. 92, 1999, 4th Estate paperback edition.
"I am trivial, endlessly trivial, she thinks." p. 94, 1999, 4th Estate paperback edition.
"Venture too far for love, she tells herself, and you renounce citizenship in the country you've made for yourself. You end up just sailing from port to port." p. 97, 1999, 4th Estate paperback edition.
"It had seemed like the beginning of happiness, and Clarissa is still sometimes shocked, more than thirty years later, to realize that it  happiness; that the entire experience lay in a kiss and a walk, the anticipation of dinner and a book...What lives undimmed in Clarissa's mind more than three decades later is a kiss at dusk on a patch of dead grass, and a walk around a pond as mosquitoes droned in the darkening air. There is still that singular perfection, and it's perfect in part because it seemed, at the time, so clearly to promise more. Now she knows: That was the moment, right then. There has been no other." p. 98, 1999, 4th Estate paperback edition.

Mrs. Brown
Laura's cake is complete but she is not happy. It is less than she had hoped it would be. She had invested great and desperate hopes in the cake, like an artist working on a great piece of art, and in her mind, she failed. Laura catalogs what she will do to keep busy for the rest of the day: prepare for Dan's party. She knows Dan will be happy with whatever she prepares. This slightly annoys her. She realizes her husband's happiness "depends only on the fact of her, here in the house, living her life, thinking of him". She tries to tell herself this is a good thing and that she is being difficult but is suddenly hit by the image of Virginia Woolf putting a stone into the pocket of her coat and walking into a river. This psychic connection to another ‘desperate housewife’ is interrupted by a tap on the back door.

It is Kitty, Laura's neighbor. Laura is panicked and excited. She wants to see Kitty but she is unprepared, looking too much, she believes, like "the woman of sorrows". Kitty is invited in. She fits effortlessly and confidently into this post-war world of domestication, she seems to have it all. She notices Laura's amateur efforts at making a cake, just what Laura was dreading. Laura recognizes her inability to fit into this domestic world, but also her inability not to care – she is trapped between two worlds. She also recognizes, however, that Kitty does not have the perfect world her confidence implies. For example, Kitty has remained barren despite her desire to have children. On the other hand, the one thing Laura seems to be excelling at in the domestic sphere is producing progeny.

As the two women sip coffee Kitty admits she has to go to the hospital for a few days and wants Laura to feed her pet dog. She tells Laura, somewhat evasively, that the problem is in her uterus, probably the cause of her infertility. Laura moves to comfort Kitty with an embrace. She feels a sense of what it would be like to be a man, and also a sort of jealousy towards Ray, Kitty's husband. Both women capitulate to the moment, to hold each other. Laura is kissing Kitty's forehead when Kitty lifts her face and the two women kiss each other on the lips.

It is Kitty who pulls away and Laura is assailed by a panic. She feels she will be perceived as the predator in this astounding development, and indeed "Laura and Kitty agree, silently, that this is true." She also realizes her son, Richie, has been watching everything. However Kitty is already on her way out the door, her momentary lapse of character wiped from memory. Nothing is mentioned of the kiss, she brushes off Laura's continued overtures of help politely and leaves. Laura's world has been jolted. It is too much. It is like a Virginia Woolf novel, too full. Attempting to return to the world she knows, she attends to her son and, without hesitation, dumps her freshly made cake in the bin. She will make another cake, a better one.

"Why she wonders, does it seem that she could give him anything, anything at all, and receive essentially the same response? What does he desire nothing, really, beyond what he's already got?...This, she reminds herself, is a virtue."
—Laura ruminates on Dan's relentless contentedness, p. 100, 1999, 4th Estate paperback edition.
"Her cake is a failure, but she is loved anyway. She is loved, she thinks, in more or less the way the gifts will be appreciated: because they've been given with good intentions because they exist because they are part of a world in which one wants what one gets". pp. 100–101, 1999, 4th Estate paperback edition.
"Why did she marry him? She married him out of love. She married him out of guilt; out of fear of being alone; out of patriotism."
—Laura reflects on the complex reasons she married Dan, p. 106, 1999, 4th Estate paperback edition.
"The question has been silently asked and silently answered, it seems. They are both afflicted and blessed, full of shared secrets, striving every moment. They are both impersonating someone. They are weary and beleaguered; they have taken on such enormous work."
—Laura and Kitty embrace in the kitchen, p. 110, 1999, 4th Estate paperback edition.

Mrs. Woolf
As Virginia helps Leonard and Ralph with the printing press, a servant announces Virginia's sister has arrived. Vanessa, Virginia's sister, is one-and-a-half hours early. Leonard refuses to stop working, so Virginia attends to Vanessa alone. At this time, the viewer realizes her mental problems create fear for the maids. Virginia and Vanessa go out into the garden where Vanessa's children found a dying bird. Vanessa, mirroring the character of Kitty in the Mrs Brown vignettes, has an effortless competence with life's details, be it servants or children; this highlights Virginia's awkwardness with her lot in life. Virginia believes, as she watches Vanessa's children, that the real accomplishment in life is not her "experiments in the narrative" but the producing of children, which Vanessa achieved. Virginia is out of place in such a society.

The bird the children found has died, and the children, assisted by the adults, hold a funeral for it. Virginia is aware that she and the little girl are far more invested in the funeral than Vanessa's boys, who are probably laughing at the females behind their backs. As Virginia stares longingly at the dead bird she has an epiphany: her character, Clarissa Dalloway, is not like Virginia, and would not commit suicide. Like the bird's funeral bed, Clarissa represents -to Virginia- an uncaring, even foolish thing. As such, Clarissa will represent the death bed (the counterpoint) to the character who Virginia will have commit suicide.

"Virginia looks with unanticipated pleasure at this modest circlet of thorns and flowers; this wild deathbed. She would like to lie down on it herself."
—A bird's funeral suddenly becomes the occasion for Virginia to ponder her death wish, p. 119, 1999, 4th Estate paperback edition.
"Virginia lingers another moment beside the dead bird in its circle of roses. It could be a kind of hat. It could be the missing link between millinery and death."
—Virginia humorously sees both every day and the profundity in life's events, p. 121, 1999, 4th Estate paperback edition.

Mrs. Dalloway
As Clarissa prepares for Richard's party, determined to give him the perfect tribute despite its probable triviality, she is visited by none other than Richard's old partner Louis. The visit mirrors those of Kitty and Vanessa in the other story vignettes. Clarissa is thrown off-kilter by the visit, as Laura had been by Kitty and Virginia had been by Vanessa.

Characters in The Hours
1923
Virginia Woolf;
Leonard Woolf, Virginia's husband;
Vanessa Bell, Virginia's sister.
Nelly Boxall, Virginia and Leonard's cook.
Julian, Quentin and Angelica, Vanessa's children.

1949
Laura Brown;
Dan Brown, Laura's husband;
Richie Brown, Laura's son;
Kitty, her neighbour.
Mrs Latch, babysitter.

1999
Clarissa Vaughan; a 52-year-old publisher.
Sally, Clarissa's partner;
Richard Brown, Clarissa's friend, Laura Brown's son;
Louis Waters, Richard's former lover, friend of Richard and Clarissa;
Julia Vaughan, Clarissa's daughter;
Mary Krull, Julia's friend.

Major themes

LGBT issues
The Hours concerns three generations of questionably lesbian or bisexual women. Virginia Woolf was known to have affairs with women; Laura Brown kisses Kitty in her kitchen, and Clarissa Vaughan is in a relationship with Sally who was previously Richard's lover. Peripheral characters also exhibit a variety of sexual orientations.

To some extent, the novel examines the freedom with which successive generations have been able to express their sexuality, to the public and even to themselves. As such, definable sexuality for the characters of Virginia Woolf and Laura Brown is hard to ascertain. It could be argued, as does the author Michael Cunningham himself on the DVD commentary of the film version of The Hours, that such characters born at later times in different circumstances they would come out as lesbians. For Virginia and Laura, it would have been extremely difficult to "come out". Such a position would have meant extreme consequences in societies where homosexuality was in many cases illegal, treated with extreme medical "therapies", and shunned by society. This can be understood to provide much of the undercurrent of anguish for the characters, particularly in Laura Brown's case. Without this understanding, Laura could be conceived as ungrateful or a drama queen (as indeed many readers regarded Virginia Woolf's Clarissa Dalloway when Mrs Dalloway was first published).

Mental illness
Cunningham's novel suggests, to some extent, that perceived mental illness can be a legitimate expression of perspective. The idea that sanity is a matter of perspective can be seen in Virginia Woolf's censoring of her true self because this will appear as insanity to others, even to herself; Cunningham's modern-day readership is able to understand Virginia's state of mind as other than 'insane':

"She has learned over the years that sanity involves a certain measure of impersonation, not simply for the benefit of husband and servants but for the sake, first and foremost, of one's own convictions."—Virginia Woolf. p. 83, 1999 4th Estate paperback edition.

Suicide is also a major theme in each story in the novel.

Patterns of three
Apart from the novel's three female protagonists, and the three symbiotic storylines that they appear in, there are other examples in the novel where Cunningham patterns his story on groups of three. Most conspicuous of all is the threeway relationship that once existed between Clarissa, Richard and Louis when they were three students on holiday together. In the 'Mrs Woolf' storyline there is another grouping of three (biographically factual) in Vanessa's three children, Quentin, Julian, and Angelica, who come with their mother to visit Virginia. Then there is the nuclear family of three we find in Laura Brown, her husband Dan, and their son Richie.

Michael Cunningham has admitted to his preoccupation with the number three in a televised interview with Charlie Rose. Its occurrence is prominent in the structures and character relationships of two further novels by Cunningham, Specimen Days and A Home at the End of the World.

Trivia
On her way to Richard's apartment, Clarissa Vaughan thinks she sees Meryl Streep. Meryl Streep ended up playing Clarissa Vaughan in Stephen Daldry's movie adaptation of The Hours. In the book, Clarissa Vaughan considers it might also have been Vanessa Redgrave that she saw. (Redgrave plays the part of Clarissa Dalloway in the 1997 film version of Mrs Dalloway.)
As Streep comments in The Hours DVD commentary, it was Redgrave's late daughter, Natasha Richardson, who first sent her a copy of the novel. Richardson apparently felt that Streep might enjoy reading about her fictional self in the novel.
Mrs Brown is a character in Virginia Woolf's essay, "Mr Bennett and Mrs Brown".
Two anachronisms are presented by Cunningham in his book. The first is on page 30 (1998 edition) where he writes of Virginia Woolf, "She rises from her bed and goes into the bathroom." Hogarth House was built in 1720 and in 1923, it did not have a bathroom, only an outhouse. The second is on p. 43 where Mrs Brown in 1949 sees "beside the roses stand cereal box and milk carton..." Although Lucerne Dairy did have milk cartons in 1938, they did not come into common use until the 1960s. These are both correct in the film; Woolf is depicted using a ewer and basin to wash in the morning, and the Browns have milk in a bottle.
Cunningham writes that Ralph Partridge husband of Dora Carrington worked at the Hogarth Press in 1923, however, it was "just before Christmas, [Ralph Partridge] split with the Hogarth Press". He did train Marjorie Joad in January and February 1923 as his replacement, but Cunningham writes as if he is working there still permanently. Cunningham writes on p. 72 (1998 edition), "already Marjorie has been hired...to do the jobs Ralph considers beneath him". However, Ralph had already quit.

Adaptations 

 The Hours (2002), film directed by Stephen Daldry
 The Hours: A Live Tribute (2016), short film directed by Tim McNeill
 Kevin Puts adapted the novel into an opera with the same name and a libretto by Greg Pierce, premiering in concert with the Philadelphia Orchestra in 2022, followed by its stage premiere at the Metropolitan Opera later that year, featuring Renée Fleming, Kelli O'Hara, Joyce DiDonato, directed by Phelim McDermott.

References

External links
 
 Photos of the first edition of The Hours

1998 American novels
Novels with lesbian themes
Feminist novels
American novels adapted into films
Novels adapted into operas
Novels by Michael Cunningham
Pulitzer Prize for Fiction-winning works
Books about Virginia Woolf
Stonewall Book Award-winning works
Farrar, Straus and Giroux books
PEN/Faulkner Award for Fiction-winning works
Novels set in one day
1990s LGBT novels
Novels about HIV/AIDS
Novels set in the 1920s
Novels set in the 1940s
Novels about mental health
Novels set in England